"Like I Remember You" is a song by Australian singer songwriter Vera Blue, released as a standalone single on 8 February 2019 via Island Records Australia and Universal Music Australia.

The song was released in conjunction with Greenpeace, to raise awareness to the 'People Vs Oil' campaign; a campaign focusing on protecting the Great Australian Bight from oil drilling. Vera Blue said she's doing it "...for the love of our oceans."

Vera Blue said "I was shocked when I found out that oil drilling is going to happen off Australia's southern coast, in the Great Australian Bight... The beaches of my childhood could end up covered in oil, and the thriving animals in this incredible stretch of ocean would be done for... It's no use this magical place just being a memory we tell our grandkids about: we need to protect it, now, while we still have it. We need to keep the Great Australian Bight like we remember it."

The music video was directed by Nicholas Colla and released on 7 February 2019 and features clips of Greenpeace activists on board Rainbow Warrior with powerful signage protesting oil, clips of the reef, and of Vera Blue dancing along to the track.

Reception
Laura English of Music Feeds said "The song has that same dreamy kind of sound that flows through most of Vera Blue's discography."

Track listing 
Digital download

Certifications

Credits and personnel
Credits adapted from Spotify.

 Celia Pavey – vocals, writing
 Andy Mak – writing, production
 Julia Stone – writing
 Thom Macken – writing

References

2019 songs
2019 singles
Vera Blue songs
Universal Music Australia singles
Island Records singles
Environmental songs
Songs written by Julia Stone
Songs written by Vera Blue